Saidov or Sayidov "son of Sa‘id", may refer to:
 Akmal Saidov (born 1958), Uzbekistani lawyer, statesman and politician; independent candidate on Uzbekistani presidential election, 2007;
 Kamil Saidov (born 1989), Tajikistani footballer who plays for Regar-TadAZ Tursunzoda;
 Shamil Saidov (born 1982) is a Russian professional football player;
 Ramziddin Sayidov (born 1982), Uzbekistani judoka; 
 Rustam Saidov (born 1978), boxer from Uzbekistan
 Zayd Saidov (born 1958), a businessman and politician from Tajikistan

See also 
 Saitov - surname